Kula is a town and municipality located in the West Bačka District of the autonomous province of Vojvodina, Serbia. The town has a population of 17,866, while the municipality has a population of 43,101.

Name
In Serbian, the town is known as Kula (Кула); in Rusyn as Кула, in Hungarian as Kúla, in Croatian as Kula, in German as Kula or Wolfsburg, and in Turkish as Kula.

The name Kule means "tower" in Turkish and Serbian. In the 16th-17th century, a tower with Ottoman military garrison existed at this location, hence the name of the town. However it cannot be said for sure whether Ottoman Turks or local Serbs gave this name to the town.

History
In the middle of the 17th century, during Ottoman administration, two settlements with this name were mentioned - Gornja Kula and Donja Kula. These settlements were part of the Ottoman Sanjak of Segedin and were populated by ethnic Serbs. From the end of the 17th century, the region was under administration of the Habsburg monarchy and two settlements were mentioned as Mala Kula and Velika Kula and were unpopulated. In 1714, there was a record about a single settlement named Kula that had 14 houses. In 1733, the population of the settlement numbered 251 houses and its inhabitants were Serbs. Hungarians started to settle there in 1740 and Germans in 1780 to 1785.

Until the middle of the 19th century, the settlement was part of the Batsch-Bodrog County within the Habsburg Kingdom of Hungary. In 1848-1849 it was part of the autonomous Serbian Vojvodina and from 1849 to 1860, it was part of the Voivodeship of Serbia and Banat of Temeschwar, a separate Habsburg crownland. After the abolishment of the voivodeship in 1860, the settlement was again included into Batsch-Bodrog County. In the second half of the 19th century, some Rusyns were settled here as well.

After 1867, colonization of Hungarians was intensified, and until the beginning of the 20th century they replaced Serbs as largest ethnic group in Kula. According to the 1910 census, the population of Kula was ethnically mixed: from the total population of 9,119 there was 3,679 speakers of Hungarian, 2,510 speakers of Serbian, 2,425 speakers of German, and 456 speakers of Rusyn.

After 1918, the settlement was part of the Kingdom of Serbs, Croats and Slovenes (later renamed to Kingdom of Yugoslavia). In 1918–1919, it was part of the Banat, Bačka and Baranja region, and also (from 1918 to 1922) part of the Novi Sad County. From 1922 to 1929, it was part of the Bačka Oblast, and from 1929 to 1941 part of the Danube Banovina. During World War II, From 1941 to 1944, Kula was under Axis occupation and was attached to the Horthy's Hungary.

In 1944, the Soviet Red Army and Yugoslav partisans expelled Axis troops from the region and Kula was included into autonomous province of Vojvodina within new socialist Yugoslavia. Since 1945, Vojvodina is part of the People's Republic of Serbia within Yugoslavia.

According to 1953 census, Hungarians were the largest ethnic group in the town, while subsequent censuses recorded Serb ethnic plurality. The German community left Kula at the end of World War II, while a sizable number of Serb Montenegrins from Montenegro settled there instead of Germans. After the breakup of Yugoslavia (1991-1992) and Serbia and Montenegro (2006), the town became part of an independent Republic of Serbia. Today the Serbs are the largest ethnic group in the town.

Inhabited places
The Kula municipality includes the towns of Kula and Crvenka, and also the following villages:
Kruščić
Lipar
Nova Crvenka
Ruski Krstur
Sivac

Demographics

According to the last official census done in 2011, the municipality of Kula has 43,101 inhabitants.

Ethnic groups in the Kula municipality

Serbs (58.55%)
Rusyns (10.64%)
Montenegrins (10.06%)
Hungarians (7.92%)
Ukrainians (2.99%)
Croats (1.32%)
Others and undeclared (8.52%)

Settlements by ethnic majority
Settlements with a Serb ethnic majority are: Lipar, Nova Crvenka, Sivac, and Crvenka. The settlement with a Rusyn ethnic majority is Ruski Krstur. Ethnically mixed settlements are: Kula (with a relative Serb majority) and Kruščić (with a relative Montenegrin majority).

Ethnic groups in the Kula town
The town of Kula has a total of 17,866 inhabitants, including:

Serbs (63.29%)
Hungarians (9.98%)
Montenegrins (9.51%)
Ukrainians (3.99%)
Rusyns (2.64%)
Croats (1.39%)
Others and undeclared (9.20%)

Languages in the Kula municipality
77% of the inhabitants of the Kula municipality declared Serbian as their mother language in a 2002 census.

Economy
Kula is a home to prominent Serbian confectionary products manufacturer Jaffa Crvenka.

The following table gives a preview of total number of registered people employed in legal entities per their core activity (as of 2018):

Politics
There is an initiative among the inhabitants of Crvenka and Ruski Krstur that these two settlements become their own municipalities, completely separate from Kula.

Sports

There is a football club named Hajduk Kula in the town.

Notable people
Isidor Bajic, composer, pedagogue and publisher
Duško Grujić, footballer
Dragan Škrbić, handball player
Goran Gogić, footballer

Twin towns – sister cities
Kula is twinned with:
 Bar, Montenegro
 Kalocsa, Hungary

See also
Municipalities of Serbia
List of places in Serbia
West Bačka District

Gallery

References

External links 
 

 
Places in Bačka
Populated places in West Bačka District
Municipalities and cities of Vojvodina
Towns in Serbia